Jimmy Connors did not defend his title, he chose to play in North Conway instead. 
Third-seeded Manuel Orantes won the championship for the second time and $16,000 first-prize money by defeating Arthur Ashe in the final.

Seeds
A champion seed is indicated in bold text while text in italics indicates the round in which that seed was eliminated.

Draw

Finals

Top half

Section 1

Section 2

Bottom half

Section 3

Section 4

References

External links

U.S. Clay Court Championships
1975 U.S. Clay Court Championships